Kelvin Dale Sampson (born October 5, 1955) is an American college basketball coach, currently the head coach for the University of Houston of the American Athletic Conference.

Early life
Sampson was born in the Lumbee Native American community of Deep Branch in Robeson County, North Carolina, where he excelled in the classroom and the athletic arena during his prep days at Pembroke High School, in Pembroke, North Carolina. Sampson was captain of his high school basketball team for two years, and played for his father John W. "Ned" Sampson. His father was also one of the 500 Lumbee Native Americans who made national news by driving the Ku Klux Klan out of Maxton, North Carolina in what is annually celebrated by the Lumbee as the Battle of Hayes Pond. Later he played at Pembroke State University (now UNC Pembroke), concentrating on basketball and baseball. The point guard was team captain for the Braves as a senior and earned four letters in basketball and three in baseball. He earned Dean's List recognition throughout his collegiate career and received the Gregory Lowe Memorial Award as the school's outstanding physical education major his senior year.

After earning degrees from Pembroke State in both health and physical education and political science, Sampson pursued his master's degree in coaching and administration at Michigan State University. He left with his degree and a year's experience as a graduate assistant under Jud Heathcote.

Personal life 
Sampson is married to Karen Lowry. They have one daughter, Lauren, and one son, Kellen. Lauren is the Men's Basketball Director of External Operations at the University of Houston, and Kellen is an assistant coach, also at Houston.

College coaching career 
After leaving Michigan State, Sampson moved to Montana Tech (of the NAIA) where he became assistant coach. After serving as an interim coach for one season, Sampson guided the Orediggers to a 73–45 record in his final four seasons. Montana Tech had won just 17 games combined in the three years before his arrival. Sampson turned in three consecutive 22-win seasons and claimed three Frontier Conference championships at Montana Tech. He led his teams to two NAIA District 12 title games and was named the league's coach of the year in 1983 and 1985.

Washington State
After five years at Montana Tech, Sampson joined the staff of the Washington State Cougars as an assistant to Len Stevens. After two years under Stevens, Sampson was named the head coach of the Washington State Cougars in 1988. When Sampson led the team to the NIT in 1992, it marked the first time Washington State had participated in postseason play since 1983. He was named Kodak District 14 Coach of the Year by the NABC for the second time in three years. He first won the award in 1991 when his Cougar squad produced the school's first winning season since 1983. Sampson was also named Pac-10 Coach of the Year in 1992. In his final year at the school in 1994 he led the Cougars to their first NCAA Tournament berth in 11 years. With records of 22–11 in 1992 and 20–11 in 1994, Sampson became one of only four men to win 20 or more games in a single season in Washington State history. Sampson finished with a 103–103 record in his seven seasons at WSU.

Oklahoma
Sampson became the 11th head coach at the University of Oklahoma on April 25, 1994. Sampson was named national coach of the year in 1995 (his first year at OU) by the Associated Press, United States Basketball Writers Association and Basketball Weekly after guiding the Sooners to 23–9 overall and 15–0 home marks. It was the second-best overall record posted by a first-year coach in Big 8 history.

Sampson possesses the highest winning percentage in Oklahoma history (.719). He guided OU to nine consecutive 20-win seasons. He averaged 24.4 wins over those nine campaigns. He directed the Sooners to postseason tournament berths in each of his 12 seasons (11 NCAA Tournaments), with a Sweet 16 showing in 1999, a Final Four appearance in 2002 and an Elite Eight appearance in 2003. His teams also played in the Big 12 tournament title game on five occasions during the 10 seasons he coached in the Big 12. In 2001, 2002, and 2003, the Sooners won that tournament. Sampson finished with a Big 12 Tournament record of 17–7. His 279 wins are second in school history, behind only Billy Tubbs.

The University of Oklahoma is where Sampson earned his nickname "Mr. Blue Shirt" as he only wears blue dress shirts when he coaches.

Indiana
On March 29, 2006, Sampson was named the head coach at Indiana University following the resignation of Mike Davis. Sampson was the second minority coach in the history of the Hoosier basketball program behind Davis. Upon taking the reins of the Indiana Hoosiers he noted, "I love my job at Oklahoma and I would not leave OU for any job unless it was a job like Indiana. My family and I have had 12 great years at Oklahoma, the best years of our life, but Indiana is one of the great programs in college basketball and if they call and offer, it is a job as a coach that you have to take."

In his first season at Indiana, Sampson led the Hoosiers to a 21–11 record overall and a 34th appearance in the NCAA tournament as a 7th seed in the West. Indiana beat first round opponent Gonzaga, losing in the second round to eventual Regional Champion UCLA, 54–49.

On February 22, 2008, Sampson was forced to resign due to allegations of serious NCAA violations, which included sending text messages to recruits, something that was against NCAA rules between 2007 and 2013. As a result of these allegations, Sampson received a five-year show-cause penalty. See NCAA violations section below.

NBA 
Following his resignation and penalties from the NCAA, he spent the next three years as an assistant coach for the Milwaukee Bucks followed by three years as an assistant for the Houston Rockets.

Houston Cougars

Following the expiration of the five-year show cause penalty, the Houston Cougars hired Sampson to coach the men's basketball team on April 2, 2014. Sampson was instrumental in Houston's push to raise funds to build a $25 million practice facility in 2016 and a $60 million renovation to Hofheinz Pavilion (renamed the Fertitta Center) in 2018.  Sampson led Houston to the NIT in his second and third seasons. In 2018, Houston posted its first Top 25 finish and won its first NCAA tournament game since 1984. In 2019, the Cougars won a school-record 33 games, only the fourth 30-win season in school history. They also advanced to the Sweet Sixteen, their deepest run in the tournament since advancing all the way to the national championship game in 1983 and 1984.

In 2021, Sampson led them to their first conference tournament crown since 2010. In the NCAA Tournament, the Cougars became the first team to ever play four schools seeded at ten or higher and they beat Oregon State to advance to the Final Four for the first time since 1984. Sampson became the fifteenth coach to have reached a Final Four again after a gap of over ten years, having last reached the Final Four in 2002 (only Ray Meyer, Lon Kruger, and Lou Henson had a longer gap between Final Four appearances). In 2022, Sampson's Cougars overcame season-ending injuries to two key players to win both the regular-season American Athletic Conference crown and the conference tournament and proceeded to advance to the Elite Eight in the NCAA Tournament. They finished with a record of 32–6 and a ranking of #7 in the Coaches Poll, and Sampson was voted AAC Coach of the Year for the third time.

Sampson is currently the second-winningest coach in UH history, behind only Hall of Famer Guy Lewis.

NCAA violations
Sampson played a role in the controversial recruitment of star player Eric Gordon, who signed with Indiana after reneging on an early verbal commitment to the University of Illinois. Sampson was criticized by fellow coaches for failing to communicate with then-Illinois coach Bruce Weber about the recruitment, and hiring people close to Gordon to gain favor. Some observers said that Sampson's recruitment of the verbally committed Gordon was unethical, but legal.

In addition to the Gordon incident, Sampson has been in the middle of a number of other controversies.  Under Sampson's watch, Oklahoma was placed under a three-year investigation by the NCAA for recruiting violations. At the end of their investigation, the NCAA issued a report citing more than 550 impermissible calls made by Sampson and his staff to 17 different recruits.  The NCAA barred Sampson from recruiting off campus and making phone calls for one year, ending May 24, 2007.

Prior to the findings by the NCAA, Kelvin Sampson was the President of the National Association of Basketball Coaches (NABC), an organization that supports basketball coaches across the country.  During his tenure the Ethics Committee of the NABC was formed to address the many problems with violations that college basketball faced going into the 2003 season.  That very same Ethics Committee would later reprimand Kelvin Sampson as a result of the NCAA findings, placing him on probation for three years, during which time he would not be eligible to serve in any official capacity for the NABC, be considered for Coach of the Year honors, or receive Final Four ticket privileges.

As coach at Indiana in October 2007, Sampson again came under scrutiny for making impermissible phone calls.  Despite being restricted from making any outbound recruiting phone calls, Sampson participated in approximately 10 conference calls with recruits that violate the terms of the sanctions levied against him by the NCAA. IU assistant Rob Senderoff (who later resigned) also made some 35 impermissible phone calls to recruits from his home.  On February 8, 2008, the NCAA informed Indiana that Sampson had committed five "major" rules violations.  The NCAA alleged that Sampson knowingly violated telephone recruiting restrictions imposed on him.  More seriously, the NCAA also alleged that Sampson lied to IU and NCAA officials regarding his involvement in the impermissible calls.

Indiana launched an internal investigation that school president Michael McRobbie said would take seven days. On February 14, 2008, ESPN reported that Sampson's status as coach of the Hoosiers would be decided on a "game-by-game basis." Fox Sports reported that Sampson was to be fired on February 22, 2008, but later reports indicated that Sampson would be suspended without pay.  Eventually it was announced that Sampson would resign, reaching a $750,000 settlement with Indiana.  In return, Sampson agreed not to sue Indiana for wrongful termination.  Assistant Dan Dakich was named as interim head coach for the rest of the season.

According to many college basketball pundits, however, Sampson had virtually no chance of keeping his job once the allegations broke. Sports Illustrated college basketball columnist Seth Davis implied that Indiana officials had already decided Sampson was guilty, based on the fact that its internal investigation would only last a week.  The NCAA had given Indiana 90 days to respond to the notice.  ESPN's Mark Schlabach suggested that Indiana wanted to look for a reason not to pay the remaining money he was owed on his contract, and also wanted to eliminate any chance of being sued.  He also said that the only reason Sampson was allowed to continue coaching was because his contract didn't allow the school to suspend him immediately.  ESPN's Pat Forde said that Sampson's departure was "preordained" the moment the NCAA sent out its notice of allegations, and suggested that Sampson might never coach in Division I again.

During a private meeting with the NCAA infractions committee on June 30, McRobbie apologized for hiring Sampson and called that decision a mistake.  McRobbie said that Sampson betrayed his trust as Indiana's coach, and demonstrated that his hiring had been "a risk that should not have been taken."

On November 25, 2008, the NCAA slapped Indiana with three years' probation for violations largely tied to Sampson's watch.  It also imposed a five-year show-cause order on Sampson, meaning that any NCAA member school who wanted to hire Sampson while the order was in effect would have to impose sanctions on him unless it can "show cause" that Sampson has served his punishment. However, most NCAA members will not even consider hiring a coach with an outstanding show-cause order, so the show-cause effectively prevented Sampson from coaching at the major-college level until 2013.  A similar incident happened to Todd Bozeman, who was slapped with an eight-year show-cause order in 1996 and was unable to find work in the college ranks again until 2006.  Senderoff, now head coach at Kent State, was hit with a three-year show-cause order.  When he was hired at Houston, Sampson became only the fourth coach to get a head coaching job at another school after receiving a show-cause (after Bozeman, Senderoff and Bruce Pearl).

In December 2008, Eric Gordon raised issues of drug use on the Indiana team, stating that some players were abusing drugs and that this led to the disintegration of the team, and that Sampson tried to stop it, but did not as he was focused on winning.

NBA career

On March 8, 2008, Sampson was hired in an advisory role by the San Antonio Spurs.

On May 14, 2008, Sampson was hired as assistant coach of the Bucks under Scott Skiles.

Until 2014, he had been an assistant coach with the Houston Rockets.

International basketball
Sampson coached the 2004 Under-21 USA national team to a gold medal in Under-21 Tournament of the Americas in Halifax, Nova Scotia, after it posted a 5–0 record. He was an assistant coach under George Karl for the US national team in the 2002 FIBA World Championship. Sampson was also the head coach of the United States Junior National Team that participated in the Junior World Games in Athens, Greece, in the summer of 1995.

In the summer of 1994, Sampson was selected to coach at the Goodwill Games in St. Petersburg, Russia. He served as an assistant to former Southern California head coach George Raveling. The team earned a bronze medal and competed against USA Basketball's Dream Team II following the games. In 1993, Sampson was selected head coach of the West team at the U.S. Olympic Festival in San Antonio, Texas. His squad won the silver medal.

In the summer of 2012, Sampson was assistant coach of the Canadian national men's basketball team. Steve Nash was the team's general manager and Jay Triano, the head coach.

Head coaching record

Sampson resigned on February 22, 2008, and was replaced by assistant Dan Dakich for the remainder of the season.  Indiana credits the last seven games of the season to Dakich.

See also
List of college men's basketball coaches with 600 wins
List of NCAA Division I men's basketball tournament Final Four appearances by coach

References

1955 births
Living people
20th-century Native Americans
21st-century Native Americans
American men's basketball coaches
American men's basketball players
Basketball coaches from North Carolina
Basketball players from North Carolina
College men's basketball head coaches in the United States
Guards (basketball)
Houston Cougars men's basketball coaches
Houston Rockets assistant coaches
Indiana Hoosiers men's basketball coaches
Lumbee people
Michigan State Spartans men's basketball coaches
Montana Tech Orediggers men's basketball coaches
Milwaukee Bucks assistant coaches
Native American sportspeople
NCAA sanctions
Oklahoma Sooners men's basketball coaches
People from Robeson County, North Carolina
UNC Pembroke Braves baseball players
UNC Pembroke Braves basketball players
Washington State Cougars men's basketball coaches